Berger House may refer to:

Jacob Berger House, Nome, Alaska, listed on the National Register of Historic Places (NRHP) in Nome, Alaska
Berger House (Jonesboro, Arkansas), listed on the NRHP in Craighead County, Arkansas
Berger-Graham House, Jonesboro, Arkansas, listed on the NRHP in Craighead County, Arkansas
Berger-Kiel House, Mascoutah, Illinois, NRHP-listed
Berger House (Abilene, Kansas), NRHP-listed
Berger Farmstead, Badger, South Dakota, listed on the NRHP in Kingsbury County, South Dakota